Various ancient Greek calendars began in most states of ancient Greece between Autumn and Winter except for the Attic calendar, which began in Summer.

The Greeks, as early as the time of Homer, appear to have been familiar with the division of the year into the twelve lunar months but no intercalary month Embolimos or day is then mentioned, with twelve months of 354 days. Independent of the division of a month into days, it was divided into periods according to the increase and decrease of the moon.  Each of the city-states in ancient Greece had their own calendar that was based on the cycle of the moon, but also the various religious festivals that occurred throughout the year. 

The Greeks considered each day of the month to be attributed to a different entity, such as the seventh day of each month being dedicated to Apollo. The month in which the year began, as well as the names of the months, differed among the states, and in some parts even no names existed for the months, as they were distinguished only numerically, as the first, second, third, fourth month, etc. Another way that scholars kept time was referred to as the Olympiad. This meant that the Olympic Games had just occurred and according to the four-year span, the games would not be held for another three years. Of primary importance for the reconstruction of the regional Greek calendars is the calendar of Delphi, because of the numerous documents found there recording the manumission of slaves, many of which are dated both in the Delphian and in a regional calendar. 

It was not until the second century BCE that the ancient Greek calendars adopted a numerical system for naming months. It is theorized that this was more for uniformity across the regions than to secularize the calendar. The newly numerical calendars were also created in regions federated from the leagues of Phokis, Ozolian Locris, and Akhaia. 

Below are fifteen regions of the ancient Greek world and the corresponding information of the yearly calendar.

Calendars by region

In the following tables the month names used in each Greek-speaking city are laid out with Athenian Greek letters (not necessarilly how they were spelled in the city they were used in) transliterated into English letters, and with a leading ordinal number column. The ordinal column is mostly for reference, and should not be read too literally: Different cities started their calendar year at different points in the solar year, and the month-numbers do not (necessarily) reflect the start date, which for some cities is not known. Not all of the calendars are equally well-known, and confidence and uncertainties are discussed under individual headings, below. Calendars changed from time-to-time and from city-state to city-state on an irregular basis, sometimes for intercalation.

Aetolian
The months of the Aetolian calendar have been presented by Daux (1932) based on arguments by Nititsky (1901) based on synchronisms in manumission documents found at Delphi (dated to the 2nd century BCE). The intercalary month was Dios, attested as Dios embolimos in SEG SVI 344, equivalent to Delphian Poitropoios ho deuteros. The month Boukatios corresponds to Delphian Daidaphorios, while Delphian Boukatios is Aetolian Panamos. There has been no argument to dispute the order of months, so the months found by scholars are agreed upon to be the most likely for the time. Unfortunately, there is no convenient table that describes the synchronisms, as one inscription is given for all the months. The only month to have a singular document describing it is the eleventh month, in comparison to the other numerous documents for the rest of the calendar. The Aetolian calendar was used across the League, and additionally, one could find the Aetolian calendar in use across western central Greece until the league dissolved circa the second century BCE.

Argolian

Attic
The Attic calendar, otherwise known as the Athenian calendar, is one of the best known regions today. There are numerous articles that can detail what the months are named and how the calendar came to be attested. The Attic calendar consisted of twelve months and twenty-nine to thirty days, much like the calendar now. Occasionally, the Attic calendar would be thirteen months and have an intercalary year to keep the festivals aligned with the differing seasons. Additionally, the Attic calendar created extra days to have the festivals align with the lunar cycle.

Festival calendar
With the festival version of the calendar, the months were named after the chief of the festival that corresponded to the lunar cycle.  The years were also named after the Archon who had served that year (i.e. Eponymos Archon). 

Months that had thirty days in them were referred to as Full months while months with twenty-nine days were referred to as Hollow months. This was due to the lunar cycle, and that two lunar cycles was approximately 59.06 days to them. There is additional evidence to suggest that the Attic months can be aligned with the months we have now for comparison. Such is as follows:

Civil calendar
Along with the festival calendar, the Athenian calendar had a civil calendar that coexisted and was based upon the prytanies (periods when each of the tribes served on the council). These months were thirty-six or thirty-seven days long and divided into a group of six pytranies and a group of four. This then created a ten month calendar that could be used to refer to time as well as the twelve month calendar.  

The main reason this calendar existed was to keep track of the financial transactions within the Assembly. Each month last between thirty-five and thirty-eight days that made up the additional months in the festival calendar and ran from midsummer to midsummer. However, due to the number of tribes changing constantly, this calendar changed with them. Hence the separation between the festivals and a financial calendar. Many accounts of the financial calendar comes from various writings and inscriptions from the reigns of Archons. All evidence of the calendars supports the theory that the Athenians never aligned their calendars or devised a system to draw links between certain days. Scholars assume that people referred to the calendars separately for different occasions with different people.

Boeotian 
The history on the Boeotian calendar is very limited as not many detailed records were kept. All months were named, numbered, and adjusted according to the seasons to fit the lunar year. A calendar was used as a reference in archaic times that bore resemblance to better known Greek city-states and their calendar systems. Any early evidence of the Boeotian calendar comes from Hesiod and is debated for interpretation. Hesiod's recollection of the months includes only one ( – Lēnaiōn) and this does not appear on any of the other calendars associated with Boeotia. This gap in information suggests to scholars a change in the organizing of months between the archaic and classic times in Boeotia. As most other regions in Greece, Boeotia divided their calendar months into thirds, but had differing ways to count the days. One system represented the days by ordinal numbers, another used common Greek terms to divide the months in half, and the third system indicated a division of the month into decads. With such a diversity in how the months themselves were categorized, it is hard for historians to give a definitive answer on the calendar.

Corinthian

The month names of one Corinthian calendar that belongs to the larger family of the Doric calendars, is an Epirotic calendar are inscribed in order on the dial of the Antikythera mechanism.

Cretan

Delphic

Elian
Information about the Elian calendar is scarce and very desolate. Most of the information found depends upon a scholar by the name of Pindar, and while he names some months and the organization of the calendar, much is still unknown. Pindar's work is left to interpretation, and as such, causes dispute among scholars to which version is correct. The one conclusion that is well known depends upon the Elian calendar beginning at the time of the winter solstice. However, this is still contested as to why the calendar would have a relationship with the seasons, when it may not have revolved around them in the past. As most other calendars agree, there is much evidence to suggest that the Olympic Games were hosted in the summertime, which would be reasonable to suggest this as the beginning of the year. This is the case with Athens and many regions would model their calendar after it. It would be reasonable to conclude that Elis would follow this example also, which refutes the idea of beginning at the winter solstice.

Epidaurian
The Epidaurian calendar was from the Epidauros region in ancient Greece and most extensively declared to be the formal calendar in circa fourth century BCE. Construction of the calendar was put into effect by a German born mathematician named Abraham Fraenkel, and appears to be the most widely accepted version of the order.

Laconian
Laconian calendar has several months that are presumed to follow the Spartan calendar, and even include a few of the same months (Ἑκατομβεύς, Κάρνειος, Ἡράσιος). As so many months are attested to be Spartan or belong to the surrounding Spartan areas, it is presumed that Sparta and Laconia could have shared a calendar. There is very little epigraphical data for the names of days in the Laconian calendar. The calendar has a few numerals associated with the days, but there is no way to specifically determine terminology for any of the days.

Locris
Locris itself appears to be divided into Eastern Locris and Ozolian Locris. Eastern Locris has almost no remains for its calendars, but still enough to show that two neighboring towns would have different calendars, as far back as the first century BCE. Three months in the Eastern Locris calendar have comparable months with Skarpheia and two months have comparable months with Thronion. Neither Skarpheia nor Thronion can shed light on the order of the months though. Additionally, only one date is confirmed and it corresponds to the month found in the Thronion calendar.

Skarpheia months 
 Aphámius – 
 Ermáuios – 
 Púllichos –

Thronion months 
 Itṓuios – 
 Hippíos – 

The Ozolian Locris calendar came into being after Locris broke free of Aetolia's reign after the dissolvement of the Aetolian League. This is when an affirmed calendar has been located, reaching back as for as the second century BCE. All of the months found in the Ozolian Locris calendar have been attested except for the second, ninth, and eleventh month. In particular, the Ozolian Locris calendar aligns with the Delphian calendar to show that the first month corresponds to Boukatios at Delphi, and the rest follow sequentially. However, most of the information known about Locrian months comes from Delphi, and very little is indigenous to Locris. 

As for days, only the first twenty days are confirmed in the calendar. Earlier translations lean toward the dialect with alpha, while later ones use the koine form with eta. It is not until before the first century of the Christian era that numerical names begin.

Ozolian Locris ordinal months 
The month names used in Locris, in Ozolia, are simple ordinal numbers.

Macedonian

Rhodian
Evidence for the Rhodian calendar is plentiful and comes from a multitude of inscriptions. All of the months in the year are presented and attested for, as well the count of days. However, while the names are known, the order and organization of the months is not a definitive answer. For the amount of resources found on the actual calendar, very few ancient sources mention the calendar in their writings. With the plethora of information accessible, the Rhodian calendar is one studied almost extensively as the Athenian calendar.

 ‡   Pánamos Embólimos was technically the 13th month added to the year to re‑align the lunar months with the seasonal year, but it was placed between the usual 6th and 7th months, as a second, or doubled Pánamos, rather than at the end of the year.

Sicilian

Thessalian
The Thessalian calendar was quite similar to the calendars of Pelasgiotis and Hestiaiotis. In Thessaly, the months were divided into semesters known as πρώτη and δζυτέρα έξάμηνος. The order of the months was pieced together from different sequences in ancient inscriptions. Although Thessaly had different months then those of surrounding areas such as Perrhaebian and Magnesia, the methodology of counting days within the months were similar. In Magnesia, however, the months were named after gods, such as in other Greek regions. Three decades were used and a decade plus a number suggests that in the last decade, the Thessalian region counted backward. The Thessalian calendar was standardized only in the Roman era. Previously, all poleis had their own calendars based on their respective festivals.

See also
 Ancient Greek astronomy
 Successor calendars:
 Roman calendar
 Julian calendar
 Byzantine calendar

Footnotes

Transliteration key

Greek consonants are transliterated as usual for English:  = "th";  = "ks" or "x";  = "ph";  = "ch";  = "ps". 

Transliterations are letter-by-letter and do not attempt to reduce Greek spelling conventions to phonetically equivalent English. For example
 Greek   "mp" was a spelling convention for the sound of English "b", and is left as "mp". 
 Greek   "b" is left as "b", rather than replacing it with its phonetic English "v".
 Greek  is always rendered as "ph", rather than its (usual) English equivalent "f", since it was pronounced as "p"+"h" as "ph" in English "tap-head", in the accent of Athens.
And so on.

Actual pronunciation varied by city and era. Vowels are rendered as 

with all Greek accents carried over as-is onto the Latin letter, with one exception: For typesetting reasons, in this article accented Latin letter "õ" always represents heavily accented Greek omega, never an accented omicron (because of widespread incomplete implementation of Unicode combining accents).

The propriety of Byzantine tonal diacritic marks is contentious. The simple marks rendered as an acute accent (e.g. Greek "" → English "ú") can be pronounced the same as ordinary dictionary-emphasis used for English words. Other diacritic marks similarly, although they bring up issues for subtle differences. For tonal Greek, which fell out of use early, perhaps before the creation of many of these calendars, all bets are off.

"C" and "K" are equivalent, except for "ch" chi. Latin letter "C" is now used only for Latin words borrowed from Greek. but "K" is preferred for rendering Greek with English letters. E.g. Latin "cynici" for Greek , English transliteration kunikoí, English translation "cynics". As available typesetting has changed, transliteration conventions have changed, and many old texts use forms that are now obsolete. The only sure thing is to carefully examine the Greek text, and treating all accents placed on ancient text with suspicion.

Latin letter "y" was formerly used (in Latin) for transliterating Greek upsilon, "", upper case "". Although derived from upsilon, in English, "y" has been adapted to replace old English letters, and none of its several present uses are equivalent to ancient and classical era upsilon. Ambiguous English "y" is now deprecated when using accented English letters to represent Greek, and only retained for borrowed Greek words now established in English, and their Latin cognates.

References

Bibliography
 
 
 

 
--- superseded by more complete citations given above in "refs=" §  -->

External links
 
 
 

Calendar
Obsolete calendars
Time in Greece